Yanakie Isthmus is a sandy isthmus that connects Wilsons Promontory to mainland Victoria, south-eastern Australia.  The small holiday town of Sandy Point and nearby Shallow Inlet lie on the western side of the isthmus.

Yanakie is a Koori name from the Gunai language interpreted as meaning "between waters".

References

Yanakie Isthmus at the Gazetteer of Australia Online

Isthmuses of Oceania
Wilsons Promontory
Coastline of Victoria (Australia)